The 2008 Open Gaz de France is the 2008 Tier II WTA Tour tournament of the annually-held Open Gaz de France tennis tournament. It was held from 4 February through 10 February 2008.

The total prize money for the tournament was US$600,000 with the winner of the singles receiving $95,500 and the losing finalist $51,000. The winners of the doubles competition received $30,000.

Seven of the top twenty players in the world competed in the tournament. Among them were Daniela Hantuchová and Ágnes Szávay. There was a strong Russian presence on display, with Anna Chakvetadze, Elena Dementieva and defending champion Nadia Petrova all present. Local fans had Marion Bartoli, Amélie Mauresmo and Virginie Razzano to support.

Finals

Singles

  Anna Chakvetadze defeated   Ágnes Szávay 6–3, 2–6, 6–2
It was Chakvetadze's first title of the year, and 7th of her career.

Doubles

 Alona Bondarenko /  Kateryna Bondarenko defeated  Eva Hrdinová /  Vladimíra Uhlířová 6–1, 6–4

External links
Official website

Open Gaz de France
Open GDF Suez
Open Gaz de France
Open Gaz de France
Open Gaz de France
Open Gaz de France